The Alfred B. Maclay State Gardens is a  Florida State Park, botanical garden and historic site, located in Tallahassee, in northeastern Florida. The address is 3540 Thomasville Road.

The gardens are also a U.S. historic district known as the Killearn Plantation Archeological and Historic District. It received that designation on August 16, 2002. According to the National Register of Historic Places, it contains 18 historic buildings, 4 structures and 4 objects.

History
The property associated with Maclay was part of the Lafayette Land Grant. In antebellum times, it was part of the Andalusia Plantation, growing cotton. Starting in 1882 a vineyard on the property produced wine, until Leon County voted to go dry in 1904. After that it was a quail-hunting estate called Lac-Cal.

In 1923, New York financier Alfred Barmore Maclay (1871–1944), the son of Robert Maclay, and his wife, Louise Fleischman, purchased the  Lac-Cal quail-hunting plantation and adjoining land, creating a -estate he called Killearn, after his ancestral village and birthplace of his great-grandfather in Scotland. Maclay developed the gardens continuously until his death. In 1965 the gardens were renamed in Maclay's honor, to avoid confusion with the new adjacent development called Killearn Estates.

Biology

The backbone of the garden plantings are azaleas and camellias. Trees include bald cypress, black gum, cyrilla, dogwood, hickory, holly, Japanese maple, oak, plum, redbud, Liquidambar, and Torreya taxifolia. Other plantings include Ardisia, Aucuba, Zamia integrifolia, Rhododendron chapmanii, Gardenia, ginger, jasmine, Oriental magnolia, mountain laurel (Kalmia latifolia), Nandina, palmetto, sago palm, Selaginella, Wisteria, and Yucca filamentosa.

At the front of the gardens is a Native Plant Arboretum that's maintained by the Magnolia Chapter of the Florida Native Plant Society, which includes  Piedmont azaleas, Florida flame azaleas, Eastern red columbine, white wild indigo, English dogwood, and Florida anise.

Lakes 
Lake Hall
Lake Overstreet
Lake Elizabeth or Gum Pond

Maclay House
The 1909 Maclay House has been furnished to appear as during the residence of the Maclays.  The house is open for tours during high blooming season from January through April.

Experiences and amenities
The park has such amenities as bicycling, birding, boating, canoeing, fishing, hiking, horse trails, kayaking, picnicking areas, extensive walking trails, and swimming. It also has a museum with interpretive exhibits.

Gallery

References and external links

 Official Alfred B. Maclay State Gardens website
 Alfred B. Maclay Gardens State Park at Florida State Parks
 Alfred B. Maclay Gardens State Park at State Parks
 Alfred B. Maclay State Gardens at Tallahassee Trust for Historic Preservation
 Alfred B. Maclay Gardens State Park Trails at Florida Department of Environmental Protection
 Maclay State Gardens at Absolutely Florida
 Leon County History at Florida Office of Cultural and Historical Programs
 Leon County listings at National Register of Historic Places

Specific

State parks of Florida
Parks in Tallahassee, Florida
Museums in Tallahassee, Florida
Historic house museums in Florida
Protected areas established in 1953
Arboreta in Florida
Archaeological sites in Florida
Botanical gardens in Florida
Plantations in Leon County, Florida
1953 establishments in Florida